Nuha Barrow (born 10 October 1993) is a Gambian international footballer who plays for AS Douanes, as a defender.

Career
Born in Tujereng, he has played club football for Gamtel and AS Douanes.

He made his international debut for Gambia in 2015.

References

1993 births
Living people
Gambian footballers
The Gambia international footballers
Gamtel FC players
AS Douanes (Senegal) players
Association football defenders
Gambian expatriate footballers
Gambian expatriate sportspeople in Senegal
Expatriate footballers in Senegal